Rose Hills (also known as North Whittier) is a census-designated place in Los Angeles County, California. The 2010 United States census reported Rose Hills's population was 2,803.

The CDP consists primarily of the Spy Glass Hill section of unincorporated Whittier, which is wholly surrounded by its namesake, Rose Hills Memorial Park.

Geography
According to the United States Census Bureau, the CDP has a total area of 0.4 square miles (1.1 km), all of which is land.

Demographics
At the 2010 census Rose Hills had a population of 2,803. The racial makeup of Rose Hills was 1,573 (56.1%) White (22.5% Non-Hispanic White), 54 (1.9%) African American, 9 (0.3%) Native American, 440 (15.7%) Asian, 1 (0.0%) Pacific Islander, 471 (16.8%) from other races, and 255 (9.1%) from two or more races. Hispanic or Latino of any race were 1,647 persons (58.8%).

The whole population lived in households, no one lived in non-institutionalized group quarters and no one was institutionalized.

There were 1,016 households, 308 (30.3%) had children under the age of 18 living in them, 585 (57.6%) were opposite-sex married couples living together, 120 (11.8%) had a female householder with no husband present, 48 (4.7%) had a male householder with no wife present.  There were 38 (3.7%) unmarried opposite-sex partnerships, and 3 (0.3%) same-sex married couples or partnerships. 226 households (22.2%) were one person and 44 (4.3%) had someone living alone who was 65 or older. The average household size was 2.76.  There were 753 families (74.1% of households); the average family size was 3.22.

The age distribution was 540 people (19.3%) under the age of 18, 217 people (7.7%) aged 18 to 24, 761 people (27.1%) aged 25 to 44, 908 people (32.4%) aged 45 to 64, and 377 people (13.4%) who were 65 or older.  The median age was 41.7 years. For every 100 females, there were 92.5 males.  For every 100 females age 18 and over, there were 89.7 males.

There were 1,051 housing units at an average density of 2,394.6 per square mile, of the occupied units 895 (88.1%) were owner-occupied and 121 (11.9%) were rented. The homeowner vacancy rate was 1.1%; the rental vacancy rate was 5.5%.  2,465 people (87.9% of the population) lived in owner-occupied housing units and 338 people (12.1%) lived in rental housing units.

According to the 2010 United States Census, Rose Hills had a median household income of $92,708, with 8.9% of the population living below the federal poverty line.

Education
Rose Hills is served by the Whittier City School District for elementary and junior high students and the Whittier Union High School District for high school students. Rio Hondo College is also located in this CDP.

References

Census-designated places in Los Angeles County, California
Census-designated places in California